Fairfax is an unincorporated community in Highland County, in the U.S. state of Ohio.

History
Fairfax was founded in the 1830s, and named after Fairfax, Virginia, the native home of a first settler. A post office called Fairfax was established in 1851, and remained in operation until 1906.

References

Unincorporated communities in Highland County, Ohio
Unincorporated communities in Ohio